Wenche Karin Nistad (born 1952) is a Norwegian businessperson and civil servant.

She hails from Sande i Sunnfjord. She took her siv.øk. degree at the Norwegian School of Economics and Business Administration in 1976, and worked in Norsk Elektrisk & Brown Boveri from 1976 to 1984. She was the director of Bergen Bank from 1984, and in Den norske Bank after the 1990 merger. From 1994 to 2003 she was the CEO of Luxo. She then went on to Hadeland Glassverk, but resigned in 2004 after a tenure of only thirteen months. Dagens Næringsliv speculated that there was a conflict with owner Atle Brynestad. On 1 June 2005 Nistad assumed office as director of the Norwegian Guarantee Institute for Export Credits.

References

1952 births
Living people
Norwegian bankers
Directors of government agencies of Norway
Norwegian School of Economics alumni
People from Sogn og Fjordane
People from Sunnfjord
20th-century Norwegian businesswomen
20th-century Norwegian businesspeople
Women bankers
21st-century Norwegian businesswomen
21st-century Norwegian businesspeople